Charles Horner may refer to:
 Charles Horner (jeweller) (1837–1896), English jeweller
 Charles Horner (cricketer) (1857–1925), English cricketer
 Chuck Horner (born 1936), retired USAF general
 Charles Horner (diplomat) (born 1943), U.S. diplomat
 Charles T. Horner Jr. (1916–1992), U.S. Army officer

See also
Charles Horn (disambiguation)
Charles Horne (disambiguation)